is a Japanese volleyball player who won the bronze medal at the 2013 U23 World Championship with the Japan's U23 national team. She also competed at the 2020 Summer Olympics, in Women's volleyball. Now, she is the senior national team captain.

Career
Koga played with the Kumamoto Shin-ai Girls' High School team, winning the 2011 All-Japan Junior High School championship and receiving the Excellent Player award. Koga played for the senior national team for the first time at the Alassio Cup in May 2013. She won the gold medal at the 2012 Asian Youth Girls Championship claimed by her National Junior team and she also won the Most Valuable Player award and Best Scorer of the tournament.

In October 2013, Koga competed in the 2013 FIVB Women's U23 Volleyball World Championship and won the bronze medal. Koga was named one of the best outside hitters.

On 23 Jan 2015 NEC Red Rockets announced her joining the team.

Clubs
 Kumamoto Shin-ai Girls' High School
 NEC Red Rockets (2015–)

Awards

Individuals
 2011 All-Japan Junior High School Championship - Excellent Player Award
 2012 Asian Youth Girls U17 Volleyball Championship (AVC) in Chengdu, China - Best Scorer and MVP
 2013 All-Japan High School Championship - Excellent Player Award
 2013 FIVB Women's U23 Volleyball World Championship in Tijuana, Mexico - Best Outside Hitter
 2015/16 Japan V.Premier League - Best Newcomer Award (Rookie of the Year)
 2016 Asian Women's Club Volleyball Championship (AVC) in Biñan City, Philippines - MVP (Most Valuable Player)
 2017 Japan V.Premier League - Best6 and MVP (Most Valuable Player)

Team
 2014/15 Japan V.Premier League -  Champion - NEC Red Rockets

 2016 Asian Women's Club Volleyball Championship (AVC) in Biñan City, Philippines -  Champion - NEC Red Rockets
 2016/17 Japan V.Premier League -  Champion - NEC Red Rockets

National Team 
 2012 Asian Youth Girls U17 Volleyball Championship (AVC) in Chengdu, China -  Champion
 2013 FIVB Women's U23 World Championship in Tijuana, Mexico -  Bronze medal
 2014 Asian Junior Women's U19 Volleyball Championship (AVC) in Chinese Taipei -  Silver medal
 2015 Montreux Volley Masters in Switzerland -  Silver medal
 2017 Asian Senior Women's Volleyball Championship (AVC) in Biñan City, Philippines -  Continental Champion

Personal life 
On 31 December 2022, Koga announced her marriage to the Japan Men's Volleyball Team Opposite Hitter, Yuji Nishida.

References

■ 2016 / 17V · Premier League Women's Commendation Player List
http://www.vleague.or.jp/news_topics/article/id=19664

Japanese women's volleyball players
Living people
1996 births
People from Saga Prefecture
Volleyball players at the 2020 Summer Olympics
Olympic volleyball players of Japan